Achyra eneanalis is a moth in the family Crambidae. It was described by Schaus in 1923. It is found on the Galapagos Islands.

References

Moths described in 1923
Pyraustinae
Taxa named by William Schaus
Moths of South America